"Higher Ground" is a song recorded by Jennifer Rush for her 1989 album, Wings of Desire. It was written by Ken Cummings and Mark Blatt, and produced by Phil Ramone. "Higher Ground" was released as the first single from Wings of Desire in December 1989. Later, the song was recorded in French by Mario Pelchat and Celine Dion for Pelchat's 1993 album. This version was released as a promotional single in Canada.

Jennifer Rush version
The song is a panegyric in which Rush praises her partner for loving her and explains that should (s)he ever need assistance, she will be "standing on higher ground" and will look after him.

Released as the first single from Wings of Desire, "Higher Ground" peaked at number 30 in Austria, number 54 in Germany and number 98 in the United Kingdom. To promote the single, a music video was released which features Rush singing and dancing.

Rush performed the song on Peter's Popshow. According to the liner notes of her next album, The Power of Jennifer Rush, she explained that after that performance she slipped off the stage and broke her leg; despite honoring most of her tour dates, this caused a considerable delay in recording The Power of Jennifer Rush, and was the reason that album was issued as a compilation album rather than a studio album. The song also appears on Jennifer Rush: The Hit Box (2002), The Power of Love: The Complete Video Collection (2004), Hit Collection and Stronghold – The Collector's Hit Box.

Formats and track listings
European 7" single
"Higher Ground" – 4:20
"Angel" – 4:39

European 12" single
"Higher Ground" (Extended Version) – 6:31
"Angel" – 4:39
"Higher Ground" (Single Version) – 4:20

UK 7" single
"Higher Ground" (7" Version) – 4:20
"The Power of Love" – 4:20

UK CD single
"Higher Ground" (7" Version) – 4:20
"Higher Ground" (Extended Version) – 6:31
"The Power of Love" – 4:20

Charts

Mario Pelchat and Celine Dion version

In 1993, "Higher Ground" was covered in French by Canadian singers, Mario Pelchat and Celine Dion. Titled "Plus haut que moi", with words written by Eddy Marnay and production handled by Aldo Nova, it was included on Pelchat's 1993 album, Pelchat. "Plus haut que moi" was released as the third single from the album in Canada. It entered the chart in Quebec on September 11, 1993, peaked at number six and stayed on the chart for nineteen weeks. In 2005, Dion included "Plus haut que moi" on the L'intégrale edition of her compilation, On ne change pas.

Formats and track listings
Canadian promotional CD single
"Plus haut que moi" – 4:18

Charts

References

1989 singles
1989 songs
1993 singles
CBS Records singles
Celine Dion songs
French-language songs
Song recordings produced by Phil Ramone
Songs written by Eddy Marnay
Male–female vocal duets